Blue Kentucky Girl is the fourth studio album by American country music singer-songwriter Loretta Lynn. It was released on June 14, 1965, by Decca Records.

The album features four songs written by Lynn, "Night Girl", "Love's Been Here and Gone", "Farther to Go", and "Two Steps Forward". It also includes cover versions of previous country hits, Connie Smith's "Then and Only Then" and Johnny Cash's "I Still Miss Someone".

Critical reception

In the June 26, 1965 issue, Billboard published a review of the album which said, "Her current hit is "Blue Kentucky Girl" and this album is a beautiful showcase for not only that tune, but the classic "Send Me the Pillow That You Dream On" and "I Still Miss Someone" sung with impact and vivaciousness by Grand Ole Oprys Loretta Lynn. The hit will make this a strong seller in the country music field."

 Commercial performance 
The album debuted at No. 18 on the US Billboard Hot Country Albums chart dated July 10, 1965. It would peak at No. 14 the following week. The album spent 8 weeks on  the chart.

The only single from the album, "Blue Kentucky Girl", was released in March 1965 and peaked at No. 7 on the US Billboard Hot Country Singles chart.

Recording
Recording of the album took place over three sessions on March 4, 15 and 16, 1965, at Columbia Recording Studio in Nashville, Tennessee. Two songs on the album had been recorded at sessions for previous albums. "Blue Kentucky Girl" had been recorded on October 14, 1964, at a session for 1965's Songs from My Heart...., and "The Beginning of the End" was recorded during the January 9, 1963 session for 1963's Loretta Lynn Sings.

 Track listing 

Personnel
Adapted from the Decca recording session records.
Willie Ackerman – drums
Harold Bradley – electric bass guitar, electric guitar
Floyd Cramer – piano
Buddy Harman – drums
Don Helms – steel guitar
Junior Huskey – bass
The Jordanaires – backing vocals
Loretta Lynn – lead vocals
Grady Martin – guitar
Bob Moore – bass
Harold Morrison – banjo
Wayne Moss – guitar, electric guitar
Hal Rugg – steel guitar
Teddy Wilburn – guitar

ChartsAlbumSingles'

References 

1965 albums
Loretta Lynn albums
Albums produced by Owen Bradley
Decca Records albums